Hundred-Dollar Baby is the 34th Spenser novel by Robert B. Parker. The story follows Boston-based PI Spenser as he tries to help an old runaway prostitute he helped several years earlier, April Kyle.

Plot

April Kyle appears in Spenser's office after several years without any contact.  She's been put in charge of a new upscale brothel by her mentor, the madame Patricia Utley.  She says she's being harassed by someone who wants her to pay an extraordinary protection fee.  Thugs appear and scare off her customers.  Spenser and Hawk manage to fend off the thugs, but things are not as they seem as soon as Spenser starts asking questions.  April begs him to stop investigating, but, Spenser being Spenser, can't stop until he unravels the mystery.  What surfaces is a web of deceit, greed and the fragile psyche of April Kyle.

Recurring characters
Spenser
Hawk
April Kyle
Dr. Susan Silverman, Ph.D.
Cpt. Martin Quirk, Boston Police Department
Sgt. Frank Belson, Boston Police Department
Tedy Sapp
Patricia Utley
Tony Marcus
Leonard
Ty-Bop
Junior

External links
 Page on the book from Parker's official website

2006 American novels
Spenser (novel series)
Novels about American prostitution
American detective novels